The posterior labial arteries are branches of the internal pudendal artery.

Arteries of the abdomen